Jørre André Kjemperud (born 31 August 1968 in Vikersund) is a beach volleyball player from Norway.

Volleyball
Kjemperud started playing volleyball when he was 17 – 18 years old. He has played 20 matches on the men's national team.

Beach volleyball
While playing indoor volleyball, he used beach volleyball as a preparation for the indoor season, but after a while, beach volleyball became his main sport.

He always wears his cap backwards.

Team Kjemperud – Hoidalen
Kjemperud won the bronze medal in the men's beach team competition at the 2001 Beach Volleyball World Championships in Klagenfurt, Austria, partnering Vegard Høidalen. Kjemperud/Høidalen teamed up in 1995, and split up in 2004. They did not spend much time together outside practice and matches, and the team was known for being temperamental on court.
Kjemperud/Høidalen represented Norway at the 2000 Summer Olympics in Sydney, Australia, and the 2004 Summer Olympics in Athens, Greece, and both times they ended up in 9th place. Kjemperud teamed up with Hoidalen again in 2008.

Team Kjemperud – Skarlund

His best placement on the world tour with teammate Tarjei Skarlund, is a 4th place in 2007, and a 5th place in 2006, 2007 and 2008. Kjemperud/Skarlund teamed up in 2005. Kjemperud and Skarlund represented Norway at the 2008 Summer Olympics in Beijing, China. The team split up after the Olympics, where they ended up in 19th place.

References

External links
 
 

1968 births
Living people
Norwegian men's volleyball players
Norwegian beach volleyball players
Men's beach volleyball players
Beach volleyball players at the 2000 Summer Olympics
Beach volleyball players at the 2004 Summer Olympics
Beach volleyball players at the 2008 Summer Olympics
Olympic beach volleyball players of Norway